Christoph Meschenmoser (born 29 July 1983 in Duisburg) is a German cyclist.

Palmares
2001
1st  Junior World Pursuit Champion
1st  Junior National Time Trial Championships
2002
2nd European U23 Madison Championships
2005
2nd Neuseen Classics
3rd Overall Mainfranken-Tour
2008
3rd Overall Tour de Korea

References

1983 births
Living people
German male cyclists
Sportspeople from Duisburg
Cyclists from North Rhine-Westphalia